Serra de l'Espina  is a limestone mountain chain located at the north-eastern end of the Iberian System. It connects the Ports de Tortosa-Beseit mountain massif with the Catalan Pre-Coastal Range.

Geography
The Serra de l'Espina ridge's highest point is L'Espina (1,181.6 m). Other high peaks are Mola Carrascosa (1.025 m), Cap de la Faixa Blanca (1.023 m), Tossal de Montclí (960 m) and La Moleta d'Alfara (812 m).

On the eastern side of the range are some visible barren patches, devoid of vegetation owing to high winds, the very large Rases del Maraco, or Les Rases, at the southern end and Erms de Canduca further north. Other noteworthy places are Solana de les Feixes, the Cova dels Adells karstic cave and the ruins of Mas del Roig, an ancient farmhouse.

The Serra de Paüls mountain range is located to the north of this range.

Features

See also
La Moleta (Alfara de Carles)
Ports de Tortosa-Beseit 
Catalan Pre-Coastal Range 
Iberian System

References

External links

UEC - Guia itineraria dels Ports
UEC Tortosa

Espina
Ports de Tortosa-Beseit